Graham Frank Howell (born 18 February 1951) is an English former professional footballer who played as a full back for Manchester City, Bradford City, Brighton & Hove Albion and Cambridge United, making 160 appearances in the Football League. He then spent six seasons with Swedish club Västerås SK, which included a return of 2 goals from 26 appearances in the 1978 Allsvenskan season, and also played for Irsta IF. He remained in Sweden after his playing career finished.

References

1951 births
Living people
People from Urmston
English footballers
Association football fullbacks
Manchester City F.C. players
Bradford City A.F.C. players
Brighton & Hove Albion F.C. players
Cambridge United F.C. players
Västerås SK Fotboll players
English Football League players
Allsvenskan players
English expatriate footballers
Expatriate footballers in Sweden